2 Days & 1 Night is a Chinese variety show.  It is based on the South Korean reality show 2 Days & 1 Night and it is broadcast on Sichuan Television.

Synopsis
The cast members have made various trips throughout Sichuan's major landmarks and complete for transportation, food, services, sleeping location, etc.

Broadcast
The first season of 2 Days & 1 Night debuted on 27 October 2013 on 8:30 PM through 10:00 PM every Sunday night on SRT: Sichuan TV.
The second season of 2 Days & 1 Night debuted on 14 September 2014 on 9:15 PM through 10:30 PM every Saturday night on SMG: Dragon TV.
Last updated of second season end on 30 November 2014.

Cast and character

First season
Jacky Wu Tsung-hsien is a famous host of variety show Guess he is also a singer and actor from Taiwan.
Ma Ke is a former HBS news anchor for Hunan eTV.
Kangta as famous South Korean singer.
Jiang Chao a Chinese actor known for his military roles, to costume drama roles, and sitcom roles.
Zhu Zixiao a Chinese idol actor and variety host.
Zhang Rui a Chinese idol actor and variety host.

Second season's MC
卜學亮 / Bu Xue Liang: Host and actor.
周韦彤 / Cica Zhou: Actress and model. 
杜海涛 / Du Haitao: Host and actor.
Lee Mayfair:
Masson Bái Jǔ Gāng:
Ahn Jae-hyun: South Korean actor and model.

Episodes and visited locations

First season

Family Go: 2 Days & 1 Night

Second season

Ratings

The data determined by CSM.

See also
2 Days & 1 Night (Korean version)

References

External links
2 Days & 1 Night official website 
2 Days & 1 Night official Weibo 

Chinese variety television shows
2013 Chinese television series debuts
Chinese-language television shows
Chinese television series based on South Korean television series